The following is a list of events affecting Philippine television in 1972. Events listed include television show debuts, finales, cancellations, and channel launches, closures and rebrandings, as well as information about controversies and carriage disputes.

Events
 September 23 – Seven television stations including MBC 11, ABC 5 (Associated Broadcasting Corporation, now TV5) and ABS-CBN 2 seized by the military to shut down television operations due to martial law.

Premieres

Unknown date
 November: The World Today on RBS 7 (now GMA 7)

Unknown
 Malikmata on ABC 5
 Ariel con Tina on RBS 7 (now GMA 7)
 Magandang Gabi on RBS 7 (now GMA 7)
 Noontime Matinee on RBS 7 (now GMA 7)
 Sa 'Di Mo Pami on RBS 7 (now GMA 7)

Finales
 September 16: Super Laff-In on ABS-CBN 2
 September 21: Damayan on ABS-CBN 2
 September 22:
 Newsbreak on ABS-CBN 2
 Balita Ngayon on ABS-CBN 2
 Elisa on ABS-CBN 2
 The World Tonight on ABS-CBN 2
 Big News on ABC 5
 Pangunahing Balita on ABC 5
 Top 5 Update on ABC 5
 The News with Uncle Bob on RBS 7 (now GMA 7)

Unknown
 4 na Sulok ng Daigdig on ABS-CBN 2
 Impact with Max Soliven on ABS-CBN 2
 Two for the Road on ABS-CBN 2
 Family Theater on ABS-CBN 2
 Boarding House on ABS-CBN 2
 Buhay Artista on ABS-CBN 2
 Bigay-Hilig on ABS-CBN 2
 Cafeteria Aroma on ABS-CBN 2
 Tang-Tarang-Tang on ABS-CBN 2
 Tayo'y Mag-Hapi-Hapi on ABS-CBN 2
 Family Kuarta o Kahon on ABS-CBN 2
 At Home with Nora on ABS-CBN 2
 TV Kinderland on ABS-CBN 2
 The Baby O' Brien Show on ABS-CBN 2
 The Eddie and Nova Plus on ABS-CBN 2
 The Nestor and Nida Show on ABS-CBN 2
 On with the Show on ABS-CBN 2
 Stop, Look, & Listen on ABS-CBN 2
 Twelve O’ Clock on High on ABS-CBN 2
 Tawag ng Tanghalan on ABS-CBN 2
 Your Evening with Pilita on ABS-CBN 2
 D'Sensations on ABS-CBN 2
 Tom and Jerry on ABS-CBN 2
 Bonanza on ABS-CBN 2
 The Doris Day Show on ABS-CBN 2
 Dancetime with Chito on RBS (now GMA 7)
 Maiba Naman on RBS 7 (now GMA 7)
 American Movies on RBS 7 (now GMA 7)
 Tagalog Movies on RBS 7 (now GMA 7)
 Vigilantes on IBC 13
 Straight from the Shoulder on MBC 11
 Ano ang Balita on MBC 11
 Catch Up With Tirso on MBC 11
 The Nite Owl Dance Party on MBC 11
 Balintataw on ABC 5
 Carmen on Camera on ABC 5
 Dance-O-Rama on ABC 5
 For Men Only on ABC 5
 Malikmata on ABC 5

Channels

Closures
 September 23:
MBC 11
 ABC 5
 ABS-CBN 2

Births
January 30 – Zoren Legaspi, actor and film director
April 27 – Manilyn Reynes, actress and singer
April 28 – Romnick Sarmenta, actor
June 25 – Chokoleit, comedian, actor, and TV host (d. 2019)

See also
1972 in television

References

1972 in Philippine television
Philippine television-related lists
Television in the Philippines by year